The Observatoire Midi-Pyrénées (OMP) is an astronomical observatory part of Toulouse III - Paul Sabatier University, France.

Units 
 Bernard Lyot Telescope, at Pic du Midi Observatory
 Institut de recherche en astrophysique et planétologie (IRAP)
 Laboratoire d'aérologie (LA)
 Laboratoire Géosciences Environnement Toulouse (GET)
  (LEGOS)
 Centre d'études spatiales de la biosphère (CESBIO)
 Laboratoire écologie fonctionnelle et environnement (EcoLab)

References

Astronomical observatories in France
University of Toulouse